Leptotes jeanneli, the Jeannel's blue, is a butterfly of the family Lycaenidae. It is found in Africa south of the Sahara.

The wingspan is 22–29 mm for males and 26–30 mm for females. Adults are on wing year-round, with a peak from November to April.

References

Butterflies described in 1935
Leptotes (butterfly)